Woori Yallock was a railway station on the Warburton line in Melbourne, Australia.  The station operated until the line closed in 1965.  Today, only a retaining wall for the station platform and sign remain.

 

Disused railway stations in Melbourne
Railway stations in Australia opened in 1901
Railway stations closed in 1965
1901 establishments in England
1965 disestablishments in England